Al-Qusayr is a city in western Syria, administratively part of the Homs Governorate. Nearby localities include Rablah and Zira'a to the south, Jandar further to the east, al-Dabaah to the northeast, Arjoun to the northwest and Aqrabiyah to the west.

A Muslim majority city with a significant Christian minority, al-Qusayr had a population of 29,818 in 2004 according to the Syrian census. In addition to being capital of the al-Qusayr District, it is also the administrative center of the al-Qusayr nahiyah ("subdistrict") which consisted of 60 localities with a collective population of 107,470 in 2004.

History
Al-Qusayr is the closest modern-day city to the ancient walled hilltop city of Qadesh (now the ruins known as Tell Nebi Mend, ( ft)) named for the idol worshipped by the ancients at the time and which sits north and above the plain east of the river where historians place the largest known chariot vs. chariot battle in antiquity, the Battle of Qadash, May 1274 BC between the forces of Ramesses II's Egypt and the Anatolian Empire of the Hittites of Muwatalli II.

Arab geographer Yaqut al-Hamawi visited the town in the early 13th-century, during Ayyubid rule, and noted al-Qusayr was located north of Damascus, was surrounded by gardens and possessed an extensive khan (caravansary.)

During the Khedivate Egyptian conquest of the Levant in 1832, Ibrahim Pasha, the leader of the campaign, was hosted in al-Qusayr. Following his army's withdrawal, several Egyptian families remained in the town because of its climate and abundant agriculture. Olives, apples, apricots, wheat, barley and potatoes were grown in the area.

2011–2013 Syrian civil war

Some of al-Qusayr's inhabitants participated in the 2011–2013 Syrian civil war against the government of Bashar al-Assad. The town became the destination for a number of defectors from the Syrian Army. Between the start of the rebellion in April 2011 and 13 February 2012, at least 70 residents have been killed. Since November 2011, al-Qusayr had been besieged by the army. On 13 February, about 400 army soldiers and pro-government militiamen commandeered the city's main hospital and the municipal hall. There were reportedly several pro-government snipers in the city putting daily life at a standstill and the opposition Free Syrian Army (FSA) had established a base in the city.

The people of al-Qusayr set up a local civilians committee largely to prevent inter-religious strife in the city. Between 7–9 February, the FSA kidnapped a Christian Syrian Army corporal who they suspected was cooperating with government forces and whose family, they claimed, operated an unofficial checkpoint outside al-Qusayr to harass anti-government residents. Afterward, pro-government residents kidnapped six Sunni Muslims from the city, killing one. A local mob subsequently abducted 20 Christians. All were released in an exchange deal mediated by the local civilians committee which also stipulated the exile of the corporal and his family from al-Qusayr. On 13 February, the FSA raided and captured the city's mukhabarat (intelligence or security agency) headquarters, killing five military intelligence agents in the process. In June 2012 the military chief of the armed opposition, Abdel Salam Harba, ordered the remaining thousand of the prior ten thousand Christians to leave al-Qusayr.

Four tanks were sent to the city afterward. However, one of the tanks defected to the opposition together with 30 soldiers. The defected tank managed to take out the other three tanks, killing 20 government soldiers, according to local rebels. The FSA then captured the town hall and hospital, and focused on other government positions. On 25 February, the whole town was controlled by the FSA. Since the government sent no further reinforcements, the 80 remaining government soldiers fled from their posts in al-Qusayr.

On 20 April 2012, Abdel Ghani Jawhar, an explosives expert and commander of the Fatah al-Islam group, detonated himself in al-Qusayr accidentally, while preparing explosive devices. He was wanted in Lebanon for 200 cases of murder, assassinations, attempted assassinations and explosive attacks. On 9 July, Al Jazeera reported that the Free Syrian Army recaptured the town hall, which had served as the main command center for Syrian troops in the area, and demolished it in order to prevent the Syrian government from recapturing it. It was then reported that the Free Syrian Army controlled all of the town except for a few checkpoints and the city's main hospital.

On 4 April 2013 the Syrian army launched an offensive against al-Qusayr, with the aim of capturing all villages around the rebel-held town and eventually the town itself. The Qusayr area is considered of strategic importance because it lies between the capital and the Mediterranean coast, and is close to the Lebanese border.

On 19 May 2013, the Syrian Army attempted to retake al-Qusayr. As of May 2013, there were over 25,000 civilians still living in the city. As of the beginning of June 2013, the Syrian Army regained control over 50% of the city, including the strategic al-Qusayr Military Airbase.

On 5 June 2013, the Syrian Army finally regained control of al-Qusayr, after a rapid overnight attack, allowing some rebel fighters to flee to the neighbouring village of al-Dabaah.

Demographics
In 1970 al-Qusayr had a population of 9,240. According to Syria's Central Bureau of Statistics, the city's population in the 2004 census was 29,818. The BBC estimated the population to be around 40,000 in 2011–2012. According to the 2004 census, there were 5,304 households in the city.

In 2012 al-Qusayr had a mixed population of Sunni Muslims and Catholics, along with a few hundred Alawites. Today, most of the population follows Sunni Islam, as the Christians and Alawites were driven out after the rebel takeover.

Notable people
Hadi Al Abdullah (born 1987), Syrian citizen journalist

Localities of the subdistrict
The following villages and al-Qusayr city make up the nahiyah ("subdistrict") of al-Qusayr according to the Central Bureau of Statistics (CBS).

al-Qusayr 29,818 /
Rablah 5,328 /
al-Ghassaniyah 4,509 /
al-Aqrabiyah (al-Buwaydah al-Gharbiyah) 4,326 
al-Nizariyah 3,813 /
Jusiyah al-Amar 3,447 /
al-Buwaydah al-Sharqiyah 3,196 /
al-Dabaah 3,129 /
Shinshar 3,118 /
Dahiyat al-Majd 3,061 /
Zita al-Gharbiyah 2,922 /
Arjoun 2,465 /
an-Naim 2,290 /
Zira'ah 2,250 /
al-Hoz 2,239 /
Daminah al-Sharqiyah 1,893 /
Jubaniyah (Ramtout) 1,857 /
Dibbin 1,696 /
Kafr Mousa 1610 /
al-Qurniyah 1,329 /
Mudan 1,230 /
Bluzah 1,159 /
Tell al-Nabi Mando (Qadesh) 1,068 /()
al-Hawi (al-Haweek) 1,050 /
Husseiniya 1,018 /
Daminah al-Gharbiyah 1,012 /
Samaqiat Gharbiyah 866 /
Samaqiat Sharqiyah 864 /
al-Souadiyah 861 /
Hawsh Murshed Samaan 802 /
al-Fadhliyah 798 /
al-Burhaniyah (al-Radwaniyah) 744 /
al-Saloumiyah 725 /
al-Shoumariyah 713 /
Diyabiyah 698 /
Ras al-Ain (Hasabiyah) 690 /
Saqirjah (Ain al-Tannour) 674 /
al-Sakher (Hit) 656 /
Abou Jouri 652 /
al-Masriyah 618 /
Hawsh al-Said Ali 541 /
al-Nahriyah 529 /
al-Hammam 526 /
al-Shiahat 520 /
Ain al-Safa (Akoum) 506 /
Kammam 474 /
al-Hamra 431 /
Wadi al-Hourani 379 /
al-Muh 377 /
Umm Haratain Atiq 345 /
al-Aatafiyah 317 /
al-Khaldiyah 270 /
al-Masitbah 258 /
al-Buwait 181 /
Dahiraj 156 /
Wadi Hanna 138 /
al-Andalus 106 /
Koukran (al-Sadiat) 102 /
al-Hamidiyah 64 /
al-Haidariyah 56 /

References

Bibliography

Cities in Syria
Populated places in al-Qusayr District
Christian communities in Syria